Bhim Singh (? - 19 October 1803), was the Maharaja of Marwar Kingdom ( 17 July 1793 – 19 October 1803).

He seized Mehrangarh and proclaimed himself ruler in place of his grandfather on 13 April 1792. On 20 March 1793, he surrendered and retired to his personal jagir at Sawana, and again seized the fort and proclaimed himself ruler for the second time on 17 July 1793. He spent his entire reign contesting the succession with his uncles and cousins. Bhim Singh was decided to be married to Krishna Kumari of Udaipur by her father Bhim Singh of Mewar.

He died at Mehrangarh, Jodhpur on 19 October 1803.

See also
Rulers of Marwar
Krishna Kumari (princess)

References

1803 deaths
Monarchs of Marwar
Year of birth missing